The 1967 Detroit Riot, also known as the 12th Street Riot or Detroit Rebellion, was the bloodiest of the urban riots in the United States during the "Long, hot summer of 1967". Composed mainly of confrontations between black residents and the Detroit Police Department, it began in the early morning hours of Sunday July 23, 1967, in Detroit, Michigan.

The precipitating event was a police raid of an unlicensed, after-hours bar, known as a blind pig, on the city's Near West Side. It exploded into one of the deadliest and most destructive riots in American history, lasting five days and surpassing the scale of Detroit's 1943 race riot 24 years earlier.

Governor George W. Romney ordered the Michigan Army National Guard into Detroit to help end the disturbance. President Lyndon B. Johnson sent in the United States Army's 82nd and 101st Airborne divisions. The riot resulted in 43 deaths, 1,189 injured, over 7,200 arrests, and more than 400 buildings destroyed.

The scale of the riot was the worst in the United States since the 1863 New York City draft riots during the American Civil War, and it was not surpassed until the 1992 Los Angeles riots 25 years later.

The riot was prominently featured in the news media, with live television coverage, extensive newspaper reporting, and extensive stories in Time and Life magazines. The staff of the Detroit Free Press won the 1968 Pulitzer Prize for general local reporting for its coverage.

Canadian folk singer Gordon Lightfoot wrote and recorded "Black Day in July" recounting these events on his 1968 album Did She Mention My Name?. The song was subsequently banned by radio stations in 30 American states. "Black Day in July" was later covered by The Tragically Hip on the 2003 anthology Beautiful: A Tribute to Gordon Lightfoot.

Background

Racial segregation
In the early 20th century, when African Americans migrated to Detroit in the Great Migration, the city experienced a rapidly increasing population and a shortage of housing. African Americans encountered strong discrimination in housing. Both racial covenants and unspoken agreements among whites kept black people out of certain neighborhoods and prevented most African Americans from buying their own homes. The presence of Ku Klux Klan members throughout Michigan furthered racial tensions and violence. Malcolm X's father, Earl Little, was killed in a streetcar accident in 1931, although it is alleged the Klan's Black Legion in East Lansing was involved. In addition, a system of redlining was instituted, which made it nearly impossible for black Detroiters to purchase a home in most areas of the city, effectively locking black residents into lower-quality neighborhoods. These discriminatory practices and the effects of the segregation that resulted from them contributed significantly to the racial tensions in the city before the riot. Segregation also encouraged harsher policing in African American neighborhoods, which escalated black Detroiters' frustrations leading up to the riot.

Patterns of racial and ethnic segregation persisted through the mid-20th century. In 1956, mayor Orville Hubbard of Dearborn, part of Metro Detroit, boasted to the Montgomery Advertiser that "Negroes can't get in here...These people are so anti-colored, much more than you in Alabama."[48]

Recent reforms
The election of Mayor Jerome Cavanagh in 1961 brought some reform to the police department, led by new Detroit Police Commissioner George Edwards. Detroit had acquired millions in federal funds through President Johnson's Great Society programs and invested them almost exclusively in the inner city, where poverty and social problems were concentrated. By the 1960s, many black people had advanced into better union and professional jobs. The city had a prosperous black middle class; higher-than-normal wages for unskilled black workers due to the success of the auto industry; two black Congressmen (half of the black Congressmen at the time); three black judges; two black members on the Detroit Board of Education; a housing commission that was forty percent black; and twelve black representatives representing Detroit in the Michigan legislature.[49] The city had mature black neighborhoods such as Conant Gardens. In May 1967, the federal administration ranked housing for the black community in Detroit above that of Philadelphia, New York City, Chicago, and Cleveland. Nicholas Hood, the sole black member of the nine-member Detroit Common Council, praised the Cavanagh administration for its willingness to listen to concerns of the inner city. Weeks prior to the riot, Mayor Cavanagh had said that residents did not "need to throw a brick to communicate with City Hall."[50]

There were still signs of black disaffection, however; In 1964, Rosa Parks, who had moved to Detroit in the late fifties, told an interviewer: "I don't feel a great deal of difference here [from Alabama]...Housing segregation is just as bad, and it seems more noticeable in the larger cities."[42]  The improvements mostly benefited wealthier black Detroiters, and poor black Detroiters remained frustrated by the social conditions in Detroit. Despite the modest improvements described above, segregation, police brutality and racial tension were rampant in 1960s Detroit and played a large role in inciting the riot.

Policing issues
The Detroit Police Department was administered directly by the Mayor. Prior to the riot, Mayor Cavanagh's appointees, George Edwards and Ray Girardin, worked for reform. Edwards tried to recruit and promote black police officers, but he refused to establish a civilian police review board, as African Americans had requested. In trying to discipline police officers accused of brutality, he turned the police department's rank-and-file against him. Many whites perceived his policies as "too soft on crime." The Community Relations Division of the Michigan Civil Rights Commission undertook a study in 1965 of the police, published in 1968. It claimed the "police system" was at fault for racism. The police system was blamed for recruiting "bigots" and reinforcing bigotry through the department's "value system." A survey conducted by President Johnson's Kerner Commission found that prior to the riot, 45 percent of police working in black neighborhoods were "extremely anti-Negro" and an additional 34 percent were "prejudiced."

In 1967, 93% of the force was still white, although 30% of the city residents were black. Incidents of police brutality caused black residents to feel at risk.  They resented many police officers who they felt talked down to them, addressing men as "boys" and women as "honey" and "baby." Police made street searches of groups of young men, and single women complained of being called prostitutes for simply walking on the street. The police frequently arrested people who did not have proper identification. The local press reported several questionable shootings and beatings of black citizens by officers in the years before 1967. After the riot, a Detroit Free Press survey showed that residents reported police brutality as the number one problem they faced in the period leading up to the riot.

Black citizens complained that the police did not respond to their calls as quickly as to those of white citizens. They believed that the police profited from vice and other crime in black neighborhoods, and press accusations of corruption and connections to organized crime weakened their trust in the police. According to Sidney Fine, "the biggest complaint about vice in the ghetto was prostitution." The black community leadership thought the police did not do enough to curb white johns from exploiting local women. In the weeks leading up to the riot, police had started to work to curb prostitution along Twelfth Street. On July 1, a prostitute was killed, and rumors spread that the police had shot her. The police said that she was murdered by local pimps. Detroit police used Big 4 or Tac Squads, each made up of four police officers, to patrol Detroit neighborhoods, and such squads were used to combat soliciting.

Black residents felt police raids of after-hours drinking clubs were racially biased actions. Since the 1920s, such clubs had become important parts of Detroit's social life for black citizens; although they started with Prohibition, they continued because of discrimination against black people in service at many Detroit bars, restaurants, and entertainment venues.

Employment and unemployment
In the postwar period, the city had lost nearly 150,000 jobs to the suburbs.  Factors were a combination of changes in technology, increased automation, consolidation of the auto industry, taxation policies, the need for different kinds of manufacturing space, and the construction of the highway system that eased transportation. Major companies like Packard, Hudson, and Studebaker, as well as hundreds of smaller companies, went out of business. In the 1950s, the unemployment rate hovered near 10 percent. Between 1946 and 1956, GM spent $3.4 billion on new plants, Ford $2.5 billion, and Chrysler $700 million, opening a total of 25 auto plants, all in Detroit's suburbs. As a result, workers who could do so left Detroit for jobs in the suburbs. Other middle-class residents left the city for newer housing, in a pattern repeated nationwide. In the 1960s, the city lost about 10,000 residents per year to the suburbs. Detroit's population fell by 179,000 between 1950 and 1960, and by another 156,000 residents by 1970, which affected all its retail businesses and city services.

By the time of the riot, unemployment among black men was more than double that among white men in Detroit. In the 1950s, 15.9 percent of blacks were unemployed, but only 6 percent of whites were unemployed. This was partially due to the union seniority system of the factories. Except for Ford, which hired a significant number of black workers for their factories, the other automakers did not hire black workers until World War II resulted in a labor shortage. With lower seniority, black workers were the first to be laid off in job cutbacks after the war. Moreover, black labor was "ghettoized" into the "most arduous, dangerous and unhealthy jobs."

When the auto industry boomed again in the early 1960s, only Chrysler and the Cadillac Division of General Motors assembled vehicles in the city of Detroit.  The black workers they hired got "the worst and most dangerous jobs: the foundry and the body shop."
A prosperous, black educated class had developed in traditional professions such as social work, ministry, medicine, and nursing.  Many other black citizens working outside manufacturing were relegated to service industries as waiters, porters, or janitors. Many black women were limited to work in domestic service. Certain business sectors were known to discriminate against hiring black workers, even at entry-level positions. It took picketing by Arthur Johnson and the Detroit chapter of the NAACP before First Federal Bank hired their first black tellers and clerks.

Housing developments and discrimination

Housing in Detroit had been a major problem due to the industrial boom that started in the early 20th century. Several urban renewal projects after World War II, intended to improve housing, dramatically changed neighborhood boundaries and ethnic composition. Affordability for industrial workers and the sheer number of new people in the city resulted in a housing shortage, ultimately fostering the need to establish federal loan systems and invest in public housing, especially for minority populations. Detroit undertook a series of urban renewal projects that disproportionately affected black people, who occupied some of the oldest housing.

Racial discrimination in housing was federally enforced by redlining and restrictive covenants in the mid-20th century.  They played an important role in segregating Detroit and escalating racial tensions in the city. The Home Owners' Loan Corporation was in charge of assigning ratings of "A" (green) through "D" (red) to all of the neighborhoods in major U.S. cities based on the conditions of the buildings, the infrastructure and most importantly, the racial composition of the area. Residents of a neighborhood with a "C" or "D" rating struggled to get loans, and almost all neighborhoods with any African American population were rated "D", effectively segregating the city by race. This effectively limited options for African Americans to purchase houses outside of these areas, or acquire resources to repair their already damaged homes in these areas. In fact, only 0.8% of all new construction in the city was available to African Americans. Black Bottom and Paradise Valley (located on Detroit's lower east side, south of Gratiot) were examples of African-American neighborhoods that formed as a result of these government restrictions.

Examples of city projects for housing include the massive Gratiot Redevelopment Project, planned as early as 1946. It was planned eventually to cover a  site on the lower east side that included Hastings Street — the center of Paradise Valley. Other public housing projects also resulted in more tension between white and black people in the city. Although it seemed positive for working class individuals, the negative effects can still be felt today. Projects like Sojurner Truth were erected in 1941 to account for the unfair bias against African Americans in their housing search. However, it ended up concentrating the African Americans in areas where city whites did not want them, only furthering the racial tension in the city.

The city's goals were to “arrest the exodus of business from the central city, to convert slum property to better housing, and to enlarge the city's tax base." Bolstered by successive federal legislation, including the 1941, 1949, 1950, 1954 versions of the Housing Act and its amendments through the 1960s, the city acquired funds to develop the Detroit Medical Center complex, Lafayette Park, Central Business District Project One, and the Chrysler Freeway, by appropriating land and "clearing slums." Money was included for replacement housing in the legislation, but the goal of urban renewal was to physically reshape the city; its social effects on neighborhoods was not well understood. As older neighborhoods were demolished, black people, and people of every color from Detroit's skid row, moved to areas north of Black Bottom along Grand Boulevard, but especially to the west side of Woodward, along Grand Boulevard and ultimately the 12th Street neighborhood. As Ze'ev Chafets wrote in Devil's Night and Other True Tales of Detroit (1990's), in the 1950s the area around 12th Street rapidly changed from a community of ethnic Jews to a predominantly black community, an example of white flight. Jewish residents had moved to the suburbs for newer housing, but they often retained business or property interests in their old community. Thus, many of the blacks who moved to the 12th Street area rented from absentee landlords and shopped in businesses run by suburbanites. Crime rates rose in the 12th Street area.

By 1967, distinct neighborhood boundaries were known, whether visible (as the case on Eight Mile and Wyoming), or invisible (as the case of Dequindre Road). With white and black people culturally and physically separated, racial tensions were high in the city. As a result, African American neighborhoods were overrun, high in density, and often poor in health quality. For example, the neighborhood around 12th Street had a population density that was twice the city average. After the riot, respondents to a Detroit Free Press poll listed poor housing as the second most important issue leading up to the riot, behind police brutality.

Education

Detroit Public Schools suffered from underfunding and racial discrimination before the riots. Underfunding was a function of a decreasing tax base as the population shrank while the numbers of students rose. From 1962 to 1966, enrollment grew from 283,811 to 294,653, but the loss of tax base made less funding available. At the same time, middle-class families were leaving the district, and the number of low-scoring and economically disadvantaged students, mostly black, were increasing. In 1966–67, the funding per pupil in Detroit was $193 compared to $225 per pupil in the suburbs. Exacerbating this inequity were the challenges in educating disadvantaged students. The Detroit Board of Education estimated it cost twice as much to educate a "ghetto child properly as to educate a suburban child."  According to Michigan law in 1967, class sizes could not exceed thirty-five students, but in inner city schools they did, sometimes swelling to forty students per teacher. To have the same teacher/student ratio as the rest of the state, Detroit would have to hire 1,650 more teachers for the 1966–67 school year.

In 1959, the Detroit School Board passed a bylaw banning discrimination in all school operations and activities. From 1962 to 1966, black organizations continued to work to improve the quality of education of black students. Issues included class size, school boundaries, and how white teachers treated black students. The Citizens Advisory Committee on Equal Educational Opportunities reported a pattern of discrimination in the assignment of teachers and principals in Detroit schools. It also found "grave discrimination" in employment, and in training opportunities in apprenticeship programs. It was dissatisfied with the rate of desegregation in attendance boundaries. The school board accepted the recommendations made by the committee, but faced increasing community pressure. The NAACP demanded affirmative action hiring of school personnel and increased desegregation through an "open schools" policy. Foreshadowing the break between black civil rights groups and black nationalists after the riot, a community group led by Rev. Albert Cleage, Group of Advanced Leadership (GOAL), emphasized changes in textbooks and classroom curriculum as opposed to integration. Cleage wanted black teachers to teach black students in black studies, as opposed to integrated classrooms where all students were held to the same academic standards.

In April and May 1966, a student protest at Detroit Northern High School made headlines throughout the city. Northern was 98% black and had substandard academic testing scores. A student newspaper article, censored by the administration, claimed teachers and the principal "taught down" to blacks and used social promotion to graduate kids without educating them. Students walked out and set up a temporary "Freedom School" in a neighborhood church, which was staffed by many volunteer Wayne State University faculty. By May sympathy strikes were planned at Eastern, and Rev. Albert Cleage had taken up the cause. When the school board voted to remove the principal and vice principal, as well as the single police officer assigned to Northern, whites regarded the board's actions as capitulation to "threats" and were outraged the "students were running the school". City residents voted against a school-tax increase.

Under the Cavanagh administration, the school board created a Community Relations Division at the deputy superintendent level. Arthur L. Johns, the former head of the Detroit chapter of the NAACP, was hired in 1966 to advance community involvement in schools, and improve "intergroup relations and affirmative action." Black dominated schools in the city continued to be overcrowded as well as underfunded.

Retail stores and services
Customer surveys published by the Detroit Free Press indicated that blacks were disproportionately unhappy with the way store owners treated them compared to whites. In stores serving black neighborhoods, owners engaged in "sharp and unethical credit practices" and were "discourteous if not abusive to their customers." The NAACP, Trade Union Leadership Council (TULC), and Congress of Racial Equality (CORE) all took up this issue with the Cavanagh administration before the riot. In 1968, the Archdiocese of Detroit published one of the largest shopper surveys in American history. It found that the inner-city shopper paid 20% more for food and groceries than the suburbanite. Some of the differences were due to economies of scale in larger suburban stores, as well as ease in transportation and delivery of goods.

Shortly after the Detroit riot, Mayor Jerome Cavanagh lashed out at the "profiteering" of merchants and asked the city council to pass an anti-gouging ordinance.

Events
The crimes reported to police included looting, arson, and sniping, and took place in many different areas of Detroit: on the west side of Woodward Avenue, extending from the 12th Street neighborhood to Grand River Avenue and as far south as Michigan Avenue and Trumbull, near Tiger Stadium. East of Woodward, the area around East Grand Boulevard, which goes east/west then north–south to Belle Isle, was involved. However, the entire city was affected between Sunday, July 23, and Thursday, July 27.

July 23

Arrest of party guests
In the early hours of Sunday (3:45 a.m.), July 23, 1967, Detroit Police Department (DPD) officers raided an unlicensed weekend drinking club (known locally as a blind pig) in the office of the United Community League for Civic Action, above the Economy Printing Company, at 9125 12th Street. They expected a few revelers inside, but instead found a party of 82 people celebrating the return of two local GIs from the Vietnam War. The police decided to arrest everyone present. While they were arranging for transportation, a sizable crowd of onlookers gathered on the street, having witnessed the raid. Later, in a memoir, William Walter Scott III, a doorman whose father was running the raided blind pig, took responsibility for starting the riot by inciting the crowd and throwing a bottle at a police officer.

Beginning of looting
After the DPD left, the crowd began looting an adjacent clothing store. Shortly thereafter, full-scale looting began throughout the neighborhood. The Michigan State Police, Wayne County Sheriff's Department, and the Michigan Army National Guard were alerted, but because it was Sunday, it took hours for Police Commissioner Ray Girardin to assemble sufficient manpower. Meanwhile, witnesses described seeing a "carnival atmosphere" on 12th Street. The DPD, inadequate in number and wrongly believing that the rioting would soon expire, just stood there and watched. Police did not make their first arrest until 7 a.m., three hours after the raid on the blind pig. To the east, on Chene Street, reports said the crowd was of mixed composition. The pastor of Grace Episcopal Church along 12th Street reported that he saw a "gleefulness in throwing stuff and getting stuff out of buildings". The police conducted several sweeps along 12th Street, which proved ineffective because of the unexpectedly large numbers of people outside. The first major fire broke mid-afternoon in a grocery store at the corner of 12th Street and Atkinson. The crowd prevented firefighters from extinguishing it, and soon more smoke filled the skyline.

Local responses
The local news media initially avoided reporting on the disturbance so as not to inspire copy-cat violence, but the rioting started to expand to other parts of the city, including looting of retail and grocery stores elsewhere. By Sunday afternoon, news had spread, and people attending events such as a Fox Theater Motown revue and Detroit Tigers baseball game were warned to avoid certain areas of the city. Motown's Martha Reeves was on stage at the Fox, singing "Jimmy Mack," and was asked to tell people to leave quietly, as there was trouble outside. After the game, Tigers left fielder Willie Horton, a Detroit resident who had grown up not far from 12th Street, drove to the riot area and stood on a car in the middle of the crowd while still in his baseball uniform. Despite Horton's impassioned pleas, he could not calm the crowd.

Mayor Jerome Cavanagh stated that the situation was "critical" but not yet "out of control." At 7:45 p.m. that first (Sunday) night, Cavanagh enacted a citywide 9:00 p.m. – 5:30 a.m. curfew, prohibited sales of alcohol and firearms, and informally curtailed business activity in recognition of the serious civil unrest engulfing sections of the city. A number of adjoining communities also enacted curfews. There was significant white participation in the rioting and looting, raising questions as to whether the event fits into the classical race riot category.

July 24

Police crackdowns
Michigan State Police and the Wayne County Sheriff's Department were called in to Detroit to assist an overwhelmed Detroit police force. As the violence spread, the police began to make numerous arrests to clear rioters off the streets, housing the detainees in makeshift jails. Beginning Monday, people were detained without being brought to Recorder's Court for arraignment. Some gave false names, making the process of identifying those arrested difficult because of the need to take and check fingerprints. Windsor Police were asked to help check fingerprints.

Police began to take pictures of looters arrested, the arresting officer, and the stolen goods, to speed up the process and postpone the paperwork. More than eighty percent of those arrested were black.  About twelve percent were women. Michigan National Guardsmen were not authorized to arrest people, so state troopers and police officers made all arrests without discriminating between civilians and criminals.

Partisan political responses
Michigan Governor George Romney and President Lyndon B. Johnson initially disagreed about the legality of sending in federal troops. Johnson said he could not send federal troops in without Romney's declaring a "state of insurrection", to meet compliance with the Insurrection Act.

As the historian Sidney Fine details in Violence in the Model City, partisan political issues complicated decisions, as is common in crisis. George Romney was expected to run for the Republican presidential nomination in 1968, and President Johnson, a Democrat, did not want to commit troops solely on Romney's direction. Added to this was Mayor Jerome Cavanagh's own political and personal clash with Romney. Cavanagh, a young Irish Catholic Democrat who had cultivated harmonious relations with black leaders, both inside and outside the city, was initially reluctant to ask Romney, a Republican, for assistance.

Chaos

The violence escalated throughout Monday, resulting in some 483 fires, 231 incidents reported per hour, and 1,800 arrests. Looting and arson were widespread. Black-owned businesses were not spared. One of the first stores looted in Detroit was Hardy's drug store, owned by black people and known for filling prescriptions on credit. Detroit's leading black-owned women's clothing store was burned, as was one of the city's best-loved black restaurants. In the wake of the riots, a black merchant said, "you were going to get looted no matter what color you were." Firefighters of the Detroit Fire Department who were attempting to fight the fires were shot at by rioters. During the riots, 2,498 rifles and 38 handguns were stolen from local stores. It was obvious that the City of Detroit, Wayne County, and State of Michigan forces were unable to restore order.

John Conyers speech
On Monday, U.S. Representative John Conyers (D-Michigan), who was against federal troop deployment, attempted to ease tensions by driving along 12th Street with a loudspeaker asking people to return to their homes. Reportedly, Conyers stood on the hood of the car and shouted through a bullhorn, "We're with you! But, please! This is not the way to do things! Please go back to your homes!" But the crowd refused to listen. Conyers' car was pelted with rocks and bottles.

July 25

Military occupation
Shortly before midnight on Monday, July 24, President Johnson authorized the use of federal troops in compliance with the Insurrection Act of 1807, which authorizes the President to call in armed forces to fight an insurrection in any state against the government. This gave Detroit the distinction of being the only domestic American city to have been occupied by federal troops three times. The United States Army's 82nd Airborne Division and 101st Airborne Division had earlier been positioned at nearby Selfridge Air Force Base in suburban Macomb County. Starting at 1:30a.m. on Tuesday, July 25, some 8,000 Michigan Army National Guardsmen were deployed to quell the disorder. Later, their number would be augmented with 4,700 paratroopers from both the 82nd and 101st Airborne Divisions, and 360 Michigan State Police officers.

Chaos continued; the police were overworked and tired. Detroit Police were found to have committed many acts of abuse against both blacks and whites who were in their custody.

Although only 26 of the over 7,000 arrests involved snipers, and not one person accused of sniping was successfully prosecuted, the fear of snipers precipitated many police searches. The "searching for weapons" caused many homes and vehicles to be scrutinized. Curfew violations were also common sparks to police brutality. The Detroit Police's 10th Precinct routinely abused prisoners; as mug shots later proved, many injuries came after booking. Women were stripped and fondled while officers took pictures. White landlords from New York visiting their building were arrested after a sniper call and beaten so horribly that "their testicles were still black and blue two weeks after the incident."

Death of Tanya Blanding 
A four-year-old girl named Tanya Blanding was shot and killed during the riot while she huddled in the living room of her second-floor apartment, a few steps from the intersection of 12th and Euclid, in the heart of the original riot area (precinct 10).

Sporadic sniper fire had been reported in the immediate area earlier in the evening and on the previous night.  Guardsmen reported one of their units under fire at the intersection and believed they had pinpointed it as coming from the apartment in which Tanya and her family lived.

As a tank of the National Guard was being moved into position directly in front of the building, one of the occupants of the Blanding apartment was said to light a cigarette. Guardsmen opened fire on the apartment with rifles and the tank's .50 caliber machine gun.  At 1:20 a.m. Tanya Blanding was dead.

Sergeant Mortimer J. LeBlanc, 41, admitted firing the burst into the windows of the apartment where Tanya was found, after another Guardsman told him that sniper fire had come from there. Tanya's mother, June, filed a lawsuit for $100,000 in damages, on the grounds that Sgt. LeBlanc fired negligently into the apartment. He was exonerated.

July 26

Quelling unrest
Some analysts believed that violence escalated with the deployment of troops, although they brought rioting under control within 48 hours. Nearly all of the Michigan Army National Guard were exclusively white, inexperienced militarily, and did not have urban backgrounds, while the Army paratroopers were racially integrated and had seen service in Vietnam. As a result, the Army paratroopers were at ease and able to communicate easily in the city while the National Guardsmen were not as effective. The National Guardsmen engaged in what they said were firefights with locals, resulting in the death of one Guardsman. Of the 12 people that troops shot and killed, only one was shot by a federal soldier. Army paratroopers were ordered not to load their weapons except under the direct order of an officer. The Cyrus Vance report made afterward criticized the actions of the National Guardsmen, who shot and killed nine civilians.

Tanks and machine guns were used in the effort to keep the peace. Film footage and photos that were viewed internationally showed a city on fire, with tanks and combat troops in firefights in the streets.

Michigan Civil Rights Commission
The Michigan Civil Rights Commission intervened in the rebellion to try to protect the rights of arrestees. The arrival of the CRC was "not well received" by the police, who said the observers were interfering with police work. The Detroit Police Officers Association protested to Romney, "We resent the Civil Rights Commission looking over our shoulders, just waiting for some officer to stub his toe." At one precinct, a white officer "bitterly abused" a black CRC observer, saying that "all people of his kind should be killed."

Interracial relief organizations
As reported by United Press International, "the riots brought out the best, as well as the worst, in people."

As Louis Cassells reported on the ground for UPI:

At a moment when race relations might seem to have sunk to the lowest possible level, whites and Negroes were working together, through their churches, to minister to the hungry and homeless. The effort transcended denominational lines. By Wednesday [July 26, 1967], Protestants, Catholics and Jews had established an interfaith emergency center to coordinate the relief work. District collection centers were set up at scores of churches and synagogues across the city. The food, clothing, bedding and cash contributed through them brought to the interfaith center, from which aid was distributed strictly according to need, without regard for race, creed, or color.

Acts of kindness and generosity were not confined to religious groups. Unions, led by the United Auto Workers and the Teamsters, joined with industrial firms in setting up a truck pool to transport relief supplies into the riot area. It was not just a matter of white people being kind to black people. Often it was the other way around, I saw Negro families bringing cool drinks of water to white National Guardsmen standing post in blazing sun. On several occasions, white reporters--trapped on the streets during wild gun battles between Guardsmen and snipers--were taken into the relative safety of nearby Negro homes, even though opening the door to admit them was a real risk to the Negro family. People can be pretty wonderful--even in a riot."

July 27–28
By Thursday, July 27, sufficient order had returned to the city that officers withdrew ammunition from the National Guardsmen stationed in the riot area and ordered them to sheath their bayonets. Troop withdrawal began on Friday, July 28, the day of the last major fire in the riot. The Army troops were completely withdrawn by Saturday, July 29.

Reactions

Nationwide violence
The Detroit rebellion was a catalyst to unrest elsewhere as the uprising spread from the city into adjoining suburbs and to other areas of Michigan. Minimal rioting was reported in Highland Park and River Rouge, a heavier police presence was required after a bomb threat was phoned in to an E.J. Korvette store in Southgate and very minimal violence was reported in Hamtramck. The state deployed National Guardsmen or state police to other Michigan cities as simultaneous riots erupted in Pontiac, Flint, Saginaw, and Grand Rapids, as well as in Toledo and Lima, Ohio; New York City and Rochester, New York; Cambridge, Maryland; Englewood, New Jersey; Houston, Texas; and Tucson, Arizona. Disturbances were reported in more than two dozen cities.

Local perceptions 
Blacks and whites in Detroit viewed the events of July 1967 in very different ways. Part of the process of comprehending the damage was to survey the attitudes and beliefs of people in Detroit. Sidney Fine's chapter, "The Polarized Community," cites many of the academic and Detroit Free Press-financed public opinion surveys conducted in the wake of the riot. Although Black Nationalism was thought to have been given a boost by the civil strife, as membership in Albert Cleage's church grew substantially and the New Detroit committee sought to include black leadership like Norvell Harrington and Frank Ditto, it was whites who were much more likely to support separation.

One percent of Detroit blacks favored "total separation" between the races in 1968, whereas 17 percent of Detroit whites did. African-Americans supported "integration" by 88 percent, while only 24 percent of whites supported integration. Residents of the 12th Street area differed significantly from blacks in the rest of the city however. For example, 22 percent of 12th Street blacks thought they should "get along without whites entirely". Nevertheless, the Detroit Free Press survey of black Detroiters in 1968 showed that the highest approval rating for people was given to conventional politicians like Charles Diggs (27 percent) and John Conyers (22 percent) compared to Albert Cleage (4 percent).

Damages
In Detroit, an estimated 10,000 people participated in the riots, with an estimated 100,000 gathering to watch. Thirty-six hours later, 43 were dead, 33 of whom were black and 10 white. More than 7,200 people were arrested, most of them black. Mayor Jerome Cavanagh lamented upon surveying the damage, "Today we stand amidst the ashes of our hopes. We hoped against hope that what we had been doing was enough to prevent a riot. It was not enough."

The scale of the riot was the worst in the United States since the 1863 New York City draft riots during the American Civil War, and was not surpassed until the 1992 Los Angeles riots 25 years later.

Injuries
1,189 people were injured: 407 civilians, 289 suspects, 214 Detroit police officers, 134 Detroit firefighters, 55 Michigan National Guardsmen, 67 Michigan State Police officers, 15 Wayne County Sheriff deputies, and 8 federal soldiers.

Arrests
7,231 people were arrested: 6,528 adults and 703 juveniles; the youngest was 4 and the oldest was 82. Many of those arrested had no criminal record: 251 whites and 678 black. Of those arrested, 64% were accused of looting and 14% were charged with curfew violations.

Economic damage
2,509 businesses reported looting or damage, 388 families were rendered homeless or displaced, and 412 buildings were burned or damaged enough to be demolished. Dollar losses from property damage ranged from $40 million to $45 million.

Joe's Record Shop 

Joe's Record Shop on 8434 12th Street, owned by Joe Von Battle, was one of the businesses that was destroyed in the 1967 Detroit Riot. The business was founded in 1945, on 3530 Hastings Street, where Battle sold records and recorded music with artists like John Lee Hooker, The Reverend C.L. Franklin and Aretha Franklin. He operated from the Hastings store until 1960 when the street was razed in order to build the Chrysler Freeway. Battle along with other business owners on Hastings St. moved to 12th Street, where his shop operated until the events of July 23, 1967. During the '67 riots, Battle stood guard in front of his shop with his gun and his "Soul Brother" sign. After the first day of rioting, police authorities no longer permitted business owners to guard their shops. Days later, Battle returned to his record shop with his daughter Marsha Battle Philpot and they were met with "wet, fetid debris of what had been one of the most seminal record shops in Detroit." Joe's Record Shop and much of the stock within —including tapes and recordings of musicians— were ruined. Ultimately, Battle's store was unable to reopen due to the damage caused by the 1967 riot.

Deaths
A total of 43 people died: 33 were black and 10 were white. Among the black deaths, 14 were shot by police officers; 9 were shot by National Guardsmen; 6 were shot by store owners or security guards; 2 were killed by asphyxiation from a building fire; 1 was killed after stepping on a downed power line; and 1 was shot by a federal soldier. The National Guardsmen and Detroit Police were found to have engaged in "uncontrolled and unnecessary firing" that endangered civilians and increased police chaos. It has been suggested that the presence of snipers was imagined or exaggerated by officials, and some of the military and law enforcement casualties could have instead been friendly fire.

One black civilian, Albert Robinson, was killed by a National Guardsman responding with Detroit Police to an apartment building on the city's west side. Ernest Roquemore, a black teenager who was the last to die in the civil unrest, was killed by Army paratroopers on July 29 when caught in their crossfire directed toward someone else. The police shot three other individuals during the same firefight, with one victim needing his leg amputated. Jack Sydnor was a black sniper who fired upon police and wounded one police officer in the street. The police came close to the building where the sniper lived and ambushed in the 3rd story building room by shooting him, making Sydnor the only sniper killed during the riot.

Among the whites who died were 5 civilians, 2 firefighters, 1 looter, 1 police officer, and 1 Guardsman. Of the white sworn personnel killed, 2 firefighters died, with 1 stepping on a downed power line during attempts to extinguish a fire started by looters, while the other was shot while organizing fire units at Mack and St. Jean streets; 1 officer was shot by a looter while struggling with a group of looters; and 1 Guardsman was shot by fellow Guardsmen while being caught in the crossfire by fellow National Guardsmen firing on a vehicle which failed to stop at the roadblock. Of the white civilians killed, 2 were shot by National Guardsmen, of whom 1 was staying at her hotel room and was mistaken for a sniper; 1 was shot as she and her husband tried to drive away from a group of black rioters beating a white civilian; 1 was shot by police while working as a security guard trying to protect a store from looters; and 1 was beaten to death by a black rioter after confronting looters in his store. Only 1 white looter was killed by police while trying to steal a car part at a junkyard on the outskirts of the city.

List of deaths

Effects

Local political strife
One of the criticisms of the New Detroit committee, an organization founded by Henry Ford II, J.L. Hudson, and Max Fisher while the embers were still cooling, was that it gave credibility to radical black organizations in a misguided attempt to listen to the concerns of the "inner-city Negro" and "the rioters." Moderate black leaders such as Arthur L. Johnson were weakened and intimidated by the new credibility the rebellion gave to black radicals, some of whom favored "a black republic carved out of five southern states" and supported "breaking into gun shops to seize weapons." The Kerner Commission deputy director of field operations in Detroit reported that the most militant organizers in the 12th Street area did not consider it immoral to kill whites.

Adding to the criticism of the New Detroit committee in both the moderate black and white communities was the belief that the wealthy, white industrial leadership were giving voice and money to radical black groups as a sort of "riot insurance." The fear that "the next riot" would not be localized to inner city black neighborhoods but would include the white suburbs was common in the black middle class and white communities. White groups like "Breakthrough" started by city employee Donald Lobsinger, a Parks and Recreation Department employee, wanted to arm whites and keep them in the city because if Detroit "became black" there would be "guerrilla warfare in the suburbs".

Racial and economic shifts

Detroit Councilman Mel Ravitz said the rebellion divided not only the races- since it "deepened the fears of many whites and raised the militancy of many blacks" - but it opened up wide cleavages in the black and white communities as well. Moderate liberals of each race were faced with new political groups that voiced extremist solutions and fueled fears about future violence. Compared to the rosy newspaper stories before July 1967, the London Free Press reported in 1968 that Detroit was a "sick city where fear, rumor, race prejudice and gun-buying have stretched black and white nerves to the verge of snapping." Sidney Fine wrote that if the riot is interpreted as a protest, or a way for black grievances to be heard and addressed, it was partly successful.

The riot markedly increased the pace of Detroit's white residents moving out of the city. From 1967 to 1969, 173,000 white residents left, and from 1967 to 1978, Detroit public schools lost 74% of its white students.

The black community in Detroit received much more attention from federal and state governments after 1967, and although the New Detroit committee ultimately shed its black membership and transformed into the mainstream Detroit Renaissance group, money did flow into black-owned enterprises after the riot. However, the most significant black politician to take power in the shift from a white majority city to a black majority city, Coleman Young, Detroit's first black mayor, wrote in 1994:

In 2010, Thomas Sowell, a conservative and senior fellow at the Hoover Institution wrote in an opinion article for a website created by The Heritage Foundation:

Riot control strategies
Nationally, the rebellion confirmed for the military and the Johnson administration that military occupation of American cities would be necessary. In particular, the uprising confirmed the role of the Army Operations Center as the agent to anticipate and combat domestic guerrilla warfare.

Minority hiring
State and local governments responded to the rebellion with a dramatic increase in minority hiring.  On August 18, 1967, the State Police department swore in the first black trooper in the fifty-year history of the organization. In May 1968, Detroit Mayor Cavanaugh appointed a Special Task Force on Police Recruitment and Hiring. Thirty five percent of the police hired by Detroit in 1968 were black, and by July 1972, blacks made up 14 percent of the Detroit police, more than double their percentage in 1967. The Michigan government used its reviews of contracts issued by the state to secure an increase in nonwhite employment.  Minority group employment by the contracted companies increased by 21.1 percent.

In the aftermath of the turmoil, the Greater Detroit Board of Commerce launched a campaign to find jobs for ten thousand "previously unemployable" persons, a preponderant number of whom were black.  By Oct 12, 1967, Detroit firms had reportedly hired about five thousand African-Americans since the beginning of the jobs campaign.  According to Professor Sidney Fine, "that figure may be an underestimate."  In a Detroit Free Press survey of residents of the riot areas in the late summer of 1968, 39 percent of the respondents thought that employers had become "more fair" since the rebellion as compared to 14 percent who thought they had become "less fair."

After the riot, in one of the biggest changes, automakers and retailers lowered the entry-level job requirements. A Michigan Bell employment supervisor commented in 1968 that "for years businesses tried to screen people out. Now we are trying to find reasons to screen them in."

Housing laws
Prior to the disorder, Detroit enacted no ordinances to end housing segregation, and few had been enacted in the state of Michigan at all.  Some liberal politicians had worked for fair housing over the years, but white conservative resistance to it was organized and powerful.  The reactionary movement began to wither after the insurrection. Sidney Fine noted that:

Governor Romney immediately responded to the turmoil with a special session of the Michigan legislature, where he forwarded sweeping housing proposals that included not only fair housing, but "important relocation, tenants' rights and code enforcement legislation."  Romney had supported such proposals before in 1964 and 1965, but abandoned them in the face of organized opposition.  In the aftermath of the insurrection, the proposals again faced resistance from organized white homeowners and the governor's own Republican party, which once again voted down the legislation in the House.  This time, however, Romney did not relent and once again proposed the housing laws at the regular 1968 session of the legislature.

The governor publicly warned that if the housing measures were not passed, "it will accelerate the recruitment of revolutionary insurrectionists."  He urged "meaningful fair housing legislation" as "the single most important step the legislature can take to avert disorder in our cities."  This time the laws passed both houses of the legislature.  The Michigan Historical Review wrote that:

Stop the Robberies, Enjoy Safe Streets (STRESS)

Two years after the end of the 1967 uprising, Wayne County Sheriff Roman Gribbs, who was seen by many white Detroiters as their last "white hope" in a city with a growing black population, created the Stop the Robberies, Enjoy Safe Streets (STRESS) campaign, a secret and elite police unit that enabled police brutality.

STRESS used a tactic called "decoy operation," where police officers tried to entrap potential criminals in an undercover sting. From its inception, STRESS all but ignored white criminals, instead focusing their operations on black communities, and increased confrontations between the black community and police. During its first year of operation, the Detroit Police Department had the "highest number of civilian killings per capita of any American police department." The unit was accused of conducting 500 raids without the use of search warrants and killing 20 people within 30 months, and this fostered an unhealthy fear and hatred between the black community and the police force.

Community groups did not take long to start responding to STRESS's activities. On September 23, 1971, the State of Emergency Committee was formed to protest the killings, and thousands of people marched to demand the abolition of STRESS.

Following Senator Richard Austin, the first black person in various political and professional positions, came Senator Coleman Young. In contrast to Senator Austin's quiet and accommodating political style, Young developed a liberal, combative political style in the labor and black radical movements of the late 1930s.  Young helped organize the National Negro Labor Council (NNLC) and became its executive director. Finding himself in a position of national power, he said to his committee: "I am a part of the Negro people. I am now in process of fighting against what I consider to be attacks and discrimination against my people. I am fighting against un-American activities such as lynching and denial of the vote. I am dedicated to that fight and I don't think I have to apologize or explain it to anybody" (Foner, 1981; Young and Wheeler, 1995: 128). This statement really reflected the views of the black people in Detroit at this time.  With his position and emerging national attention, the black community began rallying behind Young for mayor in place of Roman Gribbs. Young began building part of his campaign upon what he believed to be one of the major problems for a city divided by race: STRESS. Young said, "one of the problems is that the police run the city... STRESS is responsible for the explosive polarization that now exists; STRESS is an execution squad rather than an enforcement squad. As mayor, I will get rid of STRESS" (Detroit Free Press, May 11, 1973). He added, "the whole attitude of the whole Police Department, historically, has been one of intimidation and that citizen can be kept in line with clubs and guns rather than respect." When Young was elected into office, he represented the fear and loathing of STRESS in the city that would have to be terminated.

STRESS inadvertently promoted black political power, and the abolishment of the STRESS unit initiated the beginning of bringing black people into the police department.

This matters in a larger context than simply the immediate implications of STRESS. This unit instigated the mayoral campaign and eventual candidacy of Mayor Coleman Young, who would go on to spend the next 20 years fighting for black rights and reframing the relationship between the police force and the black community. While the STRESS campaign was important on its own in terms of the individuals killed or families of these individuals, it became radically important for the cultural shift that Mayor Coleman Young would facilitate.

The global context of this campaign changed the trajectory of black political and professional power and opportunity.

African-American social advances 

In light of the event, faults in the existing system became apparent and measures were taken to solve the problems. In 1970, First Independence National Bank (now First Independence Bank) gave African Americans capital which was generally inaccessible due to redlining; this provided social mobility and better living conditions.

Others worked with the government to understand the problem, and this research provided the basis for solutions. Wayne State University partnered with the Department of Health, Education, and Welfare to create the Developmental Career Guidance Project, which studied improving the potential for poor students. Its report helped form the backbone of a number of educational programs. Other efforts to heal came from organizations like the Interfaith Action Council, which sought to bring people of different races and religions together to encourage dialogue about racial inequality.

The 1967 uprising inspired active measures to overturn stereotypes and solve day-to-day problems, with African Americans resisting inequality in their lives. William Cunningham and Eleanor Josaitis founded HOPE, an organization which targeted hunger and workplace inequality, in 1968. HOPE evolved to provide skills training for young people. General Baker and Ron March led the Dodge Revolutionary Union Movement, seeking a voice in the workplace; Alvin Bush and Irma Craft guided the Career Development Center to provide basic skills training and job placement; and the Volunteer Placement Corps assisted African Americans to obtain a college education. 
 
The most influential change came from African Americans in powerful positions. The uprising made African Americans the majority in Detroit, and gave them political power. For the first time in the city's history, African Americans could affect municipal policy. Political figures such as Mayor Coleman Young enacted policies which attempted to integrate the city. Young began with changes to the police and fire departments, implementing a two-list system which gave African Americans an equal chance of promotion; his goal was to balance the departments' racial and gender makeup. Young sought the backing of President Jimmy Carter, allowing money to flow into Detroit for improvements in education and housing. In 1972 the Detroit Common Council elected its first African American president, Erma Henderson, who fought insurance redlining and discrimination in the judicial system and public spaces.

Legacy

Public opinion 
A poll conducted by EPIC-MRA, a survey research firm, in July 2016 focused on the evolution of black–white relations since the riots. The poll surveyed 600 residents of Macomb, Oakland, and Wayne counties. The poll took place from July 14–19th, a time period the Detroit Free Press noted was "during the ongoing national furor over police shooting of African-American civilians, and retaliatory attacks on officers in Dallas and Baton Rouge."§

The respondents of the Detroit poll were more optimistic about race relations compared to the national averages. A national Washington Post/ABC News poll found that only 32% of the people they polled believed race relations were good, as opposed to the 56% and 47% of the white and black Detroiters surveyed, respectively. This was unsurprising to Reynold Farley, a retired University of Michigan sociology professor and expert on Detroit racial demographics, "I think it's easier for people in the Detroit area to have some familiarity with race relations than people in a state like Maine, where there's virtually no black population at all and the information comes from seeing violent incidents on television," he explained. In the following question, Farley's claim was validated as the stark contrast in national vs. Detroiter perception of what the future would be like was apparent. As just 10% of those polled by the Washington Post/ABC News believed that race relations we getting better, whereas 33% of white and 22% of black Detroiters thought they had improved over the past 10 years and 50% of white and 41% of blacks believed they would improve over the next five.

Although these responses were encouraging signs of a diminishing racial gap in Detroit, and a heightened attunement to race relations in the city compared to the rest of the nation, other questions concerning Detroiters' perception of the riots and how the improvement of race relations are actualized in their everyday life show there is still much mending to be done. When asked which word they would use to describe the 1967 riots - riot, rebellion or uprising - the white response was 61%, 12%, 12% and blacks, 34%, 27%, 24%, respectively. The majority of respondents did agree, however, that since the riots they believed there had been significant progress made vs little or no progress Unfortunately, many black Detroiters still feel as if they are facing the type of discrimination that led to the riots in the first place. The polled black Detroiters reporting that in the past 12 months 28% felt they had been unfairly treated in hiring, pay, or promotion, double the rate of their white counterparts. 73% also believed that they were treated less fairly than whites when attempting to find a "good job."

Labeling 
Forty years later, the event remained a source of reflection for the community.  The Detroit newspapers covered the 40th anniversary of the uprising in 2007.  Coverage often labeled the events a riot, though others viewed them through a different lens. Several articles referred to the event as a "rebellion," while others questioned the implications of thinking about the events other than as a riot.

In popular culture

Several songs directly refer to the riot. The most prominent was "Black Day in July", written and sung by Canadian singer-songwriter Gordon Lightfoot for his 1968 album Did She Mention My Name?. Others include the 1967 song "The Motor City Is Burning" by John Lee Hooker, which was also recorded by the MC5 on their 1969 album Kick Out the Jams; "Panic in Detroit", from David Bowie's 1973 album Aladdin Sane; The Temptations' 1970 single "Ball of Confusion (That's What The World Is Today)"; The Spinners 1973 single "Ghetto Child"; Marvin Gaye's "What's Happening Brother" from his 1971 album What's Going On; The title track from Detroit producer and DJ Moodymann's 2008 EP Det.riot '67, which sampled audio recordings from news reels talking about the riot.; and "Detroit '67" by Canadian singer-songwriter Sam Roberts from his 2008 album "Love at the End of the World".

An episode of Star Trek: The Original Series, "Let That Be Your Last Battlefield",  used footage of burning buildings from the 1967 Detroit Rebellion to dramatize a planetary war between two humanoid-looking factions. One was colored black on the left side and white on the right, and the other the opposite. These alien races were represented by guest stars Frank Gorshin and Lou Antonio.

Judy Blume's 1970 novel Iggie's House, which dealt with issues of racial hatred arising from a black family's moving into a predominantly white neighborhood, also referenced the riot.  The book's protagonist, Winnie, unintentionally gets off to a bad start with her new neighbors, the Garbers (who have just moved from Detroit), by asking the family's three children if they participated in any of the looting.

The riots were also depicted in the films Dreamgirls, Across the Universe and Detroit.

The December 7, 2010, episode of Detroit 1-8-7 on ABC aired archive footage and photos of Detroit during the 1967 riots.  The episode's primary storyline depicted a 2010 discovery of a black male body and a white female body in a fallout shelter constructed under a building burned down during the riots. In reality, there were two people, listed above, who lost their lives in a basement of a building that was burned down.

Jeffrey Eugenides' 2002 novel Middlesex has a detailed retelling of, and makes some social commentary on, the riot. Joyce Carol Oates's 1969 novel them climaxes with the riot. John Hersey's 1968 nonfiction book The Algiers Motel Incident is a true crime account of an incident which occurred during the riots, and the 2017 film Detroit, written by Mark Boal and directed by Kathryn Bigelow, was a dramatization based on that incident. Survivors of the incident participated in the production of the film.

Art influenced by the riots

Fine art 

Many artworks were created in response to the 1967 events, a number of which were included in the 2017 exhibition "Art of Rebellion: Black Art of the Civil Rights Movement", curated by Valerie J. Mercer for the Detroit Institute of Arts. Black Attack (1967) was painted by Detroit abstract artist Allie McGhee immediately following the event. The work includes "broad strokes of color that appear spontaneous, give form to the artists memories of strength and resolve of black people facing intense opposition to change."

In 2017, Detroit based artist Rita Dickerson created 1967: Death in the Algiers Motel and Beyond. In the work Dickerson "depicts the Algiers Motel and portraits of three young Black men killed there by police. Below the portraits are the names of men and women who have died in recent years in encounters with police, underscoring the fact that police brutality continues to cost black people their lives."

Literary art 

Bill Harris, a Detroit-based poet, playwright, and educator, wrote about the condition of the Detroit black community – referred to by him as the DBC – after July 1967 in Detroit: a young guide to the city. The book was edited by Sheldon Annis and published by Speedball Publications in 1970.

Performing arts 

Two plays based on firsthand accounts were performed in 2017. Detroit '67 presented recollections from five metro Detroiters at the Charles H. Wright Museum of African American History by the Secret Society of Twisted Storytellers. AFTER/LIFE, performed at the Joseph Walker Williams Recreation Center, presented the events from the perspectives of women and girls.

See also

Long hot summer of 1967
Detroit crime
Decline of Detroit
Kerner Commission
List of incidents of civil unrest in the United States

Other July 1967 riots
1967 Newark riots in New Jersey (12–17 July)
1967 Plainfield riots in New Jersey (14–16 July)
Cambridge riot of 1967 in Maryland (24 July)
1967 Milwaukee riot in Wisconsin

Other riots in Detroit
Detroit race riot of 1863
Detroit race riot of 1943
1968 Detroit riot following the assassination of Martin Luther King, Jr.
Livernois–Fenkell riot
1990 Detroit riot
Full list of riots in Detroit

Other similar-scale race riots
1921 Tulsa race riot
1923 Rosewood massacre
1965 Watts Riot
1968 Washington, D.C., riots
1968 Chicago riots
1968 Baltimore riots
1980 Miami riots
1992 Los Angeles riots
2011 England Riots
2020 George Floyd protests

References

Further reading
 

 
 Stone, Joel, ed. Detroit 1967: Origins, Impacts, Legacies  (Wayne State UP), 328 pages

External links
Additional resources, including photos, essays and archival material depicting the events of July 1967 are available from several websites listed below:

"12th Street, Detroit" web exhibit featuring archival documents from the Walter P. Reuther Library.
Detroit Race Riot 1967 images with captions from the Virtual Motor City Collection. Photographs are housed at the Walter P. Reuther Library at Wayne State University.
The Civil Unrest of 1967 Essay including links to several collections of archival material related to the unrest, both from community organizations and individuals active in Detroit politics. Resources held at the Walter P. Reuther Library. Also includes oral history and 134 images with captions.
Detroit riot 1967 Detroit before, during and after the riots.
July 1967 Detroit Riot  web page from PBS' Eyes on the Prize documentary.
Report of Federal Activities During the Detroit Riots by Cyrus R. Vance on President Lyndon Johnson's website.
Rutgers University website provides video clips from Detroiters who experienced the riots.
1967 Uprising, The Rebellious Life of Mrs. Rosa Parks 
 Detroit Public Library - Burton Historical Collection - Detroit Riot Photographs
 1967 Detroit Riot - Google Arts & Culture

1967 in Michigan
Detroit
Detroit
1967 in Detroit
African-American history in Detroit
Detroit
Civil rights movement
Riots and civil disorder in Detroit
July 1967 events in the United States
Police brutality in the United States
Long, hot summer of 1967